The Glazier House is a historic house in Greeley, Colorado. It was built by J. A. Woodbury for a jeweler named I. O. Glazier in 1902. Glazier was also the director of the choir at the First Baptist Church. The house was designed in the Queen Anne architectural style, with two gabled bays. It has been listed on the National Register of Historic Places since February 5, 1991.

References

Houses on the National Register of Historic Places in Colorado
National Register of Historic Places in Weld County, Colorado
Queen Anne architecture in Colorado
Houses completed in 1902